Ocinebrellus is a genus of predatory sea snails, marine gastropod mollusks in the subfamily Ocenebrinae  of the family Muricidae, the murex and rock snails.

Species
 Ocinebrellus acanthophorus (A. Adams, 1863)
 Ocinebrellus falcatus (G. B. Sowerby II, 1834)
 Ocinebrellus inornatus (Récluz, 1851)
 Ocinebrellus lumarius (Yokoyama, 1926)
Species brought into synonymy
 Ocinebrellus aduncus (G. B. Sowerby II, 1834): synonym of Ocinebrellus falcatus (G. B. Sowerby II, 1834)
 Ocinebrellus eurypteron (Reeve, 1845): synonym of Ocinebrellus falcatus (G. B. Sowerby II, 1834)

References

 Récluz, C., 1851. Description de quelques coquilles nouvelles. Journal de Conchyliologie 2: 195-216
 Crosse, H., 1862.  Description d'espèces nouvelles recueillis par M. G. Cuming dans le nord de la Chine. Journal de Conchyliologie 10: 51-57
 Fischer-Piette, E., 1950. Listes des types décrits dans le Journal de Conchyliologie et conservés dans la collection de ce journal. Journal de Conchyliologie 90: 8-23

External links
 Jousseaume, F. P. (1880). Division méthodique de la famille des Purpuridés. Le Naturaliste. 2(42): 335-338
  Barco, A.; Herbert, G.; Houart, R.; Fassio, G. & Oliverio, M. (2017). A molecular phylogenetic framework for the subfamily Ocenebrinae (Gastropoda, Muricidae). Zoologica Scripta. 46 (3): 322-335

Ocenebrinae